rajya mantri bjp 2022

Suresh Rahi is an Indian politician and a member of 17th Legislative Assembly, Uttar Pradesh of India. He represents the ‘Hargaon’ constituency in Sitapur district of Uttar Pradesh.

Political career
Suresh Rahi contested Uttar Pradesh Assembly Election as Bharatiya Janata Party candidate and defeated his close contestant Ramhet Bharti from Bahujan Samaj Party with a margin of 44,995 votes.

Posts held

References

Bharatiya Janata Party politicians from Uttar Pradesh
Living people
Uttar Pradesh MLAs 2017–2022
Year of birth missing (living people)
Uttar Pradesh MLAs 2022–2027